Estradiol enantate (EEn or E2-EN), also spelled estradiol enanthate and sold under the brand names Perlutal and Topasel among others, is an estrogen medication which is used in hormonal birth control for women. It is formulated in combination with dihydroxyprogesterone acetophenide (DHPA; algestone acetophenide), a progestin, and is used specifically as a combined injectable contraceptive. Estradiol enantate is not available for medical use alone. The medication, in combination with DHPA, is given by injection into muscle once a month.

Side effects of estradiol enantate include breast tenderness, breast enlargement, nausea, headache, and fluid retention. Estradiol enantate is an estrogen and hence is an agonist of the estrogen receptor, the biological target of estrogens like estradiol. It is an estrogen ester and a long-lasting prodrug of estradiol in the body. Because of this, it is considered to be a natural and bioidentical form of estrogen.

Estradiol enantate was first described by 1954, and was first studied in combination with DHPA as a combined injectable contraceptive in 1964. The combination was introduced for clinical use by the mid-1970s. Estradiol enantate is not available as a standalone medication (i.e., by itself without DHPA). The combination is available in Latin America and Hong Kong, and was also previously marketed in Spain and Portugal.

Medical uses

Estradiol enantate is used in combination with the progestin DHPA as a once-monthly combined injectable contraceptive for women in Latin America and Hong Kong. Estradiol enantate has been studied in feminizing hormone therapy for transgender women as well. The combination of estradiol enantate and DHPA has likewise been used by transgender women for such purposes.

Available forms

The following forms of estradiol enantate are or have been available for use:

 Estradiol enantate 10 mg and DHPA 150 mg (brand names Perlutal, Topasel, many others)
 Estradiol enantate 5 mg and DHPA 75 mg (brand names Anafertin, Patector NF, Yectames)
 Estradiol enantate 10 mg and DHPA 120 mg (brand names Unalmes, Yectuna)
 Estradiol enantate 10 mg and DHPA 75 mg (brand name Ova Repos; discontinued)

A 6 mg estradiol enantate and 90 mg DHPA formulation was also studied, but was never marketed. The combination of estradiol enantate and DHPA has also been studied at other doses ranging from 5 to 50 mg estradiol enantate and 75 to 200 mg DHPA.

The combination of estradiol enantate and DHPA is provided in ampoules at estradiol enantate concentrations of 5 mg/mL and 10 mg/mL.

Contraindications

Contraindications of estrogens include coagulation problems, cardiovascular diseases, liver disease, and certain hormone-sensitive cancers such as breast cancer and endometrial cancer, among others.

Side effects

The side effects of estradiol enantate are the same as those of estradiol. Examples of such side effects include breast tenderness and enlargement, nausea, bloating, edema, headache, and melasma. The combination of estradiol enantate and DHPA as a combined injectable contraceptive has shown no adverse effects on liver function, lipid metabolism, or coagulation.

A Brazilian case report of a prolactinoma in a transgender woman treated with 10 mg estradiol enantate every 2 weeks exists. While DHPA was not mentioned in this instance, estradiol enantate is normally formulated in combination with DHPA including in Brazil.

Overdose

Symptoms of estrogen overdosage may include nausea, vomiting, bloating, increased weight, water retention, breast tenderness, vaginal discharge, heavy legs, and leg cramps. These side effects can be diminished by reducing the estrogen dosage.

Interactions

Inhibitors and inducers of cytochrome P450 may influence the metabolism of estradiol and by extension circulating estradiol levels.

Pharmacology

Pharmacodynamics

Estradiol enantate is an estradiol ester, or a prodrug of estradiol. As such, it is an estrogen, or an agonist of the estrogen receptors. Estradiol enantate is of about 41% higher molecular weight than estradiol due to the presence of its C17β enantate ester. Because estradiol enantate is a prodrug of estradiol, it is considered to be a natural and bioidentical form of estrogen.

The combination of 10 mg estradiol enantate and 150 mg DHPA as a once-monthly combined injectable contraceptive (which achieves levels of estradiol of around 350 pg/mL) has been found to have little to no effect on many markers of estrogen-modulated liver protein synthesis, including circulating levels of HDL and LDL cholesterol, copper, ceruloplasmin, total and free cortisol, corticosteroid-binding globulin, and sex hormone-binding globulin. However, it was found to significantly increase levels of triglycerides and to significantly decrease levels of total and free testosterone. In contrast to the estradiol enantate-containing combined injectable contraceptive, low-dose ethinylestradiol-containing birth control pills produce highly significant changes in all of the preceding parameters.

Studies in women and female capuchin monkeys have found that injections of estradiol enantate and DHPA significantly alter levels of coagulation factors.

The clinical estrogenic effects of estradiol enantate and ethinylestradiol have been compared in other studies as well.

Pharmacokinetics

When estradiol enantate is administered in an oil solution by intramuscular injection, a depot effect occurs, and this results in it having a long duration of action. The duration of action of estradiol enantate is considerably longer than that of various other estradiol esters, such as estradiol benzoate, estradiol valerate, and estradiol cypionate, whereas its duration is shorter than that of estradiol undecylate. In general, the longer the fatty acid ester chain, the more lipophilic the estradiol ester, the more slowly it is released from the depot and absorbed into the circulation, and the longer its duration of action.

The pharmacokinetics of estradiol enantate have been assessed in a number of studies. It has usually been studied in combination with DHPA. Following an intramuscular injection of estradiol enantate, levels of estradiol have been found to peak after 3 to 8 days. Maximal levels of estradiol after a 5 mg injection of estradiol enantate have been found to be about 163 to 209 pg/mL and after a 10 mg injection of estradiol enantate have been found to be about 283 to 445 pg/mL. However, one outlying study reported peak estradiol levels of 850 pg/mL after an intramuscular injection of 10 mg estradiol enantate in three postmenopausal women. It used radioimmunoassay for the determinations, with no mention of chromatographic separation. Estradiol levels following an intramuscular injection of 10 mg estradiol enantate have been found to return to baseline levels of around 50 pg/mL after about 20 to 30 days. However, a metabolic study found that traces of radiolabeled estradiol enantate remained detectable in blood for at least 30 to 40 days and for as long as 60 days. Studies have reported that the elimination half-life of estradiol enantate after a single 10 mg intramuscular injection was 5.6 to 7.5 days. The volume of distribution of estradiol enantate has been reported to be 5.087 L. Estradiol enantate is excreted preferentially in urine.

There were concerns about possible accumulation of estradiol enantate and consequent estrogenic overexposure with once-monthly combined injectable contraceptives containing the medication due its long duration, and this may have limited the use of such combined injectable contraceptives. Subsequent clinical studies have found that there is very limited or no accumulation of estradiol enantate when it is used in once-a-month injectable contraceptives.

Chemistry

Estradiol enantate, also known as estradiol 17β-enantate or estra-1,3,5(10)-triene-3,17β-diol 17β-heptanoate, is a synthetic estrane steroid and the C17β enantate (heptanoate) fatty acid ester of estradiol. Other common esters of estradiol used clinically include estradiol benzoate, estradiol cypionate, estradiol undecylate, and estradiol valerate. Estradiol dienantate (component of Climacteron), or estradiol 3,17β-dienantate, has also been used.

The experimental octanol/water partition coefficient (logP) of estradiol enanthate is 6.7.

History
Estradiol enantate was first described, along with a variety of other estradiol esters, by Karl Junkmann of Schering AG in 1953. The first clinical study of estradiol enantate and DHPA as a combined injectable contraceptive was conducted in 1964. The combination was marketed by the mid-1970s.

Society and culture

Generic names
Its generic names in other languages are as follows:

 French: enantate d'estradiol and estradiol enantate
 German: estradiol enantat
 Italian: estradiolo enantato
 Portuguese and Spanish: enantato de estradiol and estradiol enantato

Estradiol enantate is also known by its former developmental code name SQ-16150. It has been referred to as estradiol heptanoate.

Brand names
Estradiol enantate has been marketed under a wide variety of brand names. It has been marketed in a few different preparations, with varying doses of estradiol enantate and DHPA. These formulations all have different brand names, which include the following († = discontinued):

 EEn 10 mg / DHPA 150 mg: Acefil, Agurin†, Atrimon†, Ciclomes, Ciclovar, Ciclovular, Cicnor†, Clinomin, Cycloven, Daiva, Damix, Deprans, Deproxone, Exuna, Ginestest, Ginoplan†, Gynomes, Horprotal, Listen, Luvonal, Neogestar, Neolutin, Nomagest, Nonestrol, Normagest, Normensil, Novular, Oterol, Ovoginal, Patector, Patectro, Perludil, Perlumes, Perlutal, Perlutale, Perlutan, Perlutin, Perlutin-Unifarma, Permisil, Preg-Less, Pregnolan, Progestrol†, Protegin, Proter, Seguralmes, Synovular, Topasel, Unigalen, Uno-Ciclo, and Vagital.
 EEn 10 mg / DHPA 120 mg: Anafertin†, Patector NF, and Yectames.
 EEn 5 mg / DHPA 75 mg: Unalmes and Yectuna.
 EEn 10 mg / DHPA 75 mg: Ova Repos†.
 Unsorted: Evitas†, Femineo†, and Primyfar†.

The combination of EEn 10 mg and DHPA 150 mg was developed under the developmental brand name Deladroxate, but this brand name was never used commercially.

Availability

Estradiol enantate has been marketed in combination with DHPA as a combined injectable contraceptive in at least 19 countries, mostly in Latin America. A few different preparations, with varying doses of EEn and DHPA and varying availability, have been introduced. These formulations have the following approval and availability († = discontinued in this country):

 EEn 10 mg / DHPA 150 mg: at least 19 countries, including Argentina, Belize, Brazil, Chile, Colombia, Costa Rica, the Dominican Republic, Ecuador, El Salvador, Guatemala, Honduras, Hong Kong, Mexico, Nicaragua, Panama, Paraguay, Peru, Portugal†, and Spain†.
 EEn 10 mg / DHPA 120 mg: at least 3 countries, including Brazil†, Chile, and Paraguay.
 EEn 5 mg / DHPA 75 mg: at least 9 countries, including Costa Rica, the Dominican Republic, El Salvador, Guatemala, Honduras, Mexico, Nicaragua, Panama, and Spain†.

EEn is also available in Canada in combination with estradiol benzoate and testosterone enantate for veterinary use as Uni-Bol.

Usage
EEn/DHPA is the most widely used combined injectable contraceptive in Latin America. It was estimated in 1995 that EEn/DHPA was used as a combined injectable contraceptive in Latin America by at least 1 million women. However, combined injectable contraceptives like EEn/DHPA are unlikely to constitute a large proportion of total contraceptive use in the countries in which they are available.

See also
 Estradiol enantate/algestone acetophenide
 Estradiol/estradiol enanthate

References

Antigonadotropins
Enanthate esters
Estradiol esters
Hormonal contraception
Phenols
Prodrugs
Synthetic estrogens
Veterinary drugs